Cunha is a municipality in the state of São Paulo in Brazil. It is part of the Metropolitan Region of Vale do Paraíba e Litoral Norte. The population is 21,459 (2020 est.) in an area of 1,407.25 km². The first inhabitants arrived in the beginning of the 18th century. The municipality was founded in 1785, it was elevated to a city in 1858. Since 1975 Cunha has become an important center of stoneware ceramics, with 5 Noborigama wood fired kilns and 16 ceramics studios in all. The city is visited for ceramics, a pleasant climate, natural parks and gastronomy. In recent years tourism to the region has grown, with visitors coming from around the region to enjoy the local state park (Parque Estadual da Serra do Mar), artisan shops such as Aracatu and Oficina da Lã as well as festivals like the annual lamb festival (Festival do Cordeiro). On October 25, 2015, Cunha hosted the first edition of the Brazilian portion of the Tour de France cycling competition.

Cunha is located in the road which connect Presidente Dutra Highway and Paraty, been a good place to stopover. Parts of this road was part of Estrada Real, which was used to carry gold and precious gems from Minas Gerais to Paraty port to be exported, what explain the historical importance of the city.

Population history

Demographics

According to the 2000 IBGE Census, the population was 23,090, of which 11,134 or 48.22% are urban and 11,936 or (51.69%) are rural. The average life expectancy was 71.69 years.  The fertility rate was at 2.41.

Tourist attractions

Historical buildings 

 Church Nossa Senhora da Conceição (Praça Cônego Siqueira s/n)
 Church Rosário (Praça do Rosário s/n)
 School Dr. Casemiro da Rocha (Rua Dr. Casemiro da Rocha, 205)
 Mercado Municipal (Rua Dom Lino, 118)
 Sobrado à Praça Coronel João Olímpio, 52 (Former Council City and City Hall)

Handcrafts

 Casa do Artesão  (Rua Jose Arantes Filho, 27)

Falls 

 Cachoeira da Barra
 Cachoeira do Barracão
 Cachoeira do Desterro
 Cachoeira do Jericó
 Cachoeira do Mato Limpo
 Cachoeira do Pimenta
 Cachoeira do Paraibuna
 Cachoeira do Paraitinga

Some of these falls which you can swim on them.

Overlook point 

 Pedra da Macela (where it is possible to see all the sea between Ubatuba and Angra dos Reis)

References

External links
 Official city hall webpage  
 citybrazil.com.br  
 Cunha on Explorevale 

Municipalities in São Paulo (state)